The individual All-Around competition of the rhythmic gymnastics events at the 2011 Pan American Games was held on October 15 at the Nissan Gymnastics Stadium. The draw for the competition took place on August 1, 2011 in Guadalajara. The defending Pan American Games champion was Lisa Wang of the United States, while the defending Pan American Championship, champion was Julie Zetlin also of the United States.

Schedule
All times are Central Standard Time (UTC-6).

Results

References 

Gymnastics at the 2011 Pan American Games
2011 in women's gymnastics